The Fajr prayer ("dawn prayer") is one of the five mandatory salah (Islamic prayer), to be performed anytime starting from the moment of dawn, but not after sunrise. As an Islamic day starts at sunset, the Fajr prayer is technically the third prayer of the day. If counted from midnight, it is usually the first prayer of the day. The Isha prayer, the daily prayer directly before the Fajr prayer, usually does not take place after midnight (depending on location).

The Fajr prayer is mentioned by name in the Quran at sura 24 (An-Nur) ayah. Inspired by the tafsir of the two hadiths that were transmitted on behalf of the Islamic prophet Muhammad, the worth of the Fajr daily prayer is explained as being God's most-favoured prayer since others are asleep.

During the Muslim holy month of Ramadan, the start of Fajr prayer time marks the beginning of the obligatory daily fasting (sawm).

Al-Fajr is also the name of the eighty-ninth chapter (sura) of the Qur'an.

The five daily prayers collectively are one pillar of the Five Pillars of Islam, in Sunni Islam, and one of the ten Practices of the Religion (Furū al-Dīn) according to Shia Islam.

Name variations

Format
The Fajr prayer consists of two rakat (prescribed movements). In a congregation, the leader of the prayer (imam) recites aloud. However, two sunnah rakaʿāt prior to the two Fard rakaʿāt are highly recommended, and named Fajr nafl prayer.

The time period within which the Fajr daily prayer must be offered (with loud recitation of the quran) is from the beginning of dawn to sunrise.

List of hadith mentioning fajr
The following quotations regarding Fajr, the Islamic dawn prayer, are from books of Sunni hadith.  These books relate accounts taken from the life of the Islamic prophet Muhammad, his family, and his companions.  They were compiled by Islamic scholars after Muhammad's death.  These quotations include information about those who related the accounts, as well as the accounts themselves.

Narrated Aisha: Muhammad never missed four Rakat before the Zuhr prayer and two Rakat before the Fajr prayer.
Narrated Abu Huraira:  Muhammad said, "If anyone of you can get one Rak'a of the 'Asr prayer before sunset, he should complete his prayer. If any of you can get one Rak'a of the Fajr prayer before sunrise, he should complete his prayer."  
Narrated 'Umar: "The Prophet forbade praying after the Subuh prayer till the sun rises and after the 'Asr prayer till the sun sets." 
Abu Hurairah stated that Muhammad had said, "There are angels who take turns in visiting you by night and by day, and they all assemble at the dawn (Subuh) and the afternoon (`Asr) prayers. Those who have spent the night with you, ascend to the heaven and their Rabb (Lord), Who Knows better about them, Asks: 'In what condition did you leave My slaves?' They reply: 'We left them while they were performing Salat and we went to them while they were performing Salat.' " From Al-Bukhari and Muslim.
Aisha reported Allah's Messenger as saying: "The two rak'ahs before the dawn (Fajr) are better than this world and what it contains."
Ahmad and Muslim record that Aishah said, "I have never seen him (Muhammad) more in haste to do a good deed than he was to perform the two rakahs (Sunnah) before the morning (Fajr prayer)."
Abu Huraira reports that Muhammad said: "Do not leave the two rak'ahs of Fajr, even if you were being attacked by cavalry."  This is confirmed by Ahmad, Abu Dawud, Al-Bayhaqi and at-Tahawi.
Abu Hurairah reported: Muhammad said, "No Salat is more burdensome to the hypocrites than the Fajr (dawn) prayer and the `Isha' (night) prayer; and if they knew their merits, they would come to them even if they had to crawl to do so.''
Zubayr ibn al-Awwam has narrated a Hadith prohibiting one to go sleep after Fajr, whereas this hadith became the basis of Makruh act for Muslims to go sleep right after the time of Fajr prayer until the sunrise.

See also
Fajr nafl prayer
Wudu
Other salah:
Zuhr prayer (Mid-day)
Asr prayer (Afternoon)
Maghrib prayer (Sunset) 
Isha prayer (Night)
Dhikr
Tasbih
 Mandaean prayer at dawn
Shacharit
Nafl prayer

References

নামাজ কি? নামাজ পড়ার নিয়ম || নামাজ পড়ার সঠিক নিয়ম Namaj Porar Niom

Further reading

 

Salah
Salah terminology